107 Squadron is a territorial reserve squadron of the South African Air Force.  The squadron operations include coastal reconnaissance, command and control and radio relay in crime prevention operations in cooperation with the South African Police in the Northern Cape.  The squadron is based in Kimberley, but is controlled by AFB Bloemspruit.

References

Squadrons of the South African Air Force
Military units and formations in Bloemfontein
Territorial Reserve Squadrons of the South African Air Force